Tobi is an island in the Palauan state of Hatohobei. With a population of about 30, it holds all of the state's people, with the exception of a weather base on Helen Island. Most of the inhabitants live on the island's west side and speak Tobian. Tobi, Helen Reef (Hotsarihie), Transit Reef (Pieraurou), and the islands in the state of Sonsorol make up the Republic of Palau's Southwest Islands.

Climate

Tobi Island has a tropical rainforest climate (Af) with heavy to very heavy rainfall year-round. The Joint Typhoon Warning Center (JTWC) a United States Navy – United States Air Force command in Hawaii uses "KOBI" as a bearing and distance in determining a tropical storm's track and position.

References

Islands of Palau
Hatohobei